Ponti may refer to:

Places
 Ponti, Greece, a village in the drama region of Greece
 Ponti, Piedmont, a province of Alessandria, Piedmont, Italy
 Ponti sul Mincio, a provincia of Mantua, Lombardy, Italy

People
 Ponti, a person who comes from Pontelandolfo, a village in Italy
 Carlo Ponti (photographer) (1823–1893), Italian photographer
 Carlo Ponti (1912–2007), Italian film producer
 Carlo Ponti Jr. (born 1968), Italian orchestral conductor, son of Carlo Ponti
 Cassandra Ponti (born 1980), Indian-Filipo actress
 Cinzia De Ponti (born 1960), Italian actress, model and television personality
 Edoardo Ponti (born 1973), Italian director
 Erich Ponti (born 1965), United States politician; see 2014 United States House of Representatives elections in Louisiana
 Ettore Ponti (1855–1919), Italian politician
 Gianluca De Ponti (born 1952), Italian professional footballer 
 Gio Ponti (1891–1979), Italian architect and designer
 Jack Ponti (born 1958), American musician, songwriter and record producer
 Marco Ponti (born 1967), Italian film director
 Michael Ponti (1937–2022), German pianist
 Moshe Ponte or Ponit (born 1956), Israeli Olympic judoka and President of the Israel Judo Association

See also
Pont (disambiguation)
Ponte (disambiguation)
 Ponto (disambiguation)
Ponty (disambiguation)
Ponzi